In graph theory, a branch of mathematics, the modular graphs are undirected graphs in which every three vertices , , and  have at least one median vertex  that belongs to shortest paths between each pair of , , and .
Their name comes from the fact that a finite lattice is a modular lattice if and only if its Hasse diagram is a modular graph.

It is not possible for a modular graph to contain a cycle of odd length. Therefore, every modular graph is a bipartite graph.

The modular graphs contain as a special case the median graphs, in which every triple of vertices has a unique median; median graphs are related to distributive lattices in the same way that modular graphs are related to modular lattices. Every chordal bipartite graph (a class of graphs that includes the complete bipartite graphs and the bipartite distance-hereditary graphs) is modular.

References

Graph families
Bipartite graphs